Qatar Boneh (also Romanized as Qaţār Boneh) is a village in Qatruyeh Rural District, Qatruyeh District, Neyriz County, Fars Province, Iran. At the 2006 census, its population was 263, in 60 families.

References 

Populated places in Neyriz County